The Roman Catholic Diocese of Mongu is a diocese located in Mongu in Zambia.

History
 June 14, 1997: Established as Diocese of Mongu from the Diocese of Livingstone

Leadership
 Bishops of Mongu (Roman rite)
 Bishop Paul Francis Duffy, O.M.I. (June 14, 1997 - February 15, 2011)
 Bishop Evans Chinyama Chinyemba, O.M.I. (since February 15, 2011)

See also
Roman Catholicism in Zambia

Sources
 GCatholic.org
 Catholic Hierarchy

Roman Catholic dioceses in Zambia
Christian organizations established in 1997
Roman Catholic dioceses and prelatures established in the 20th century
Roman Catholic Ecclesiastical Province of Lusaka